Fall of Efrafa were a British punk rock band formed in Brighton, England in 2005. They disbanded in 2009 after completing a trilogy of concept albums— Owsla (2006), Elil (2007), and Inlé (2009) — inspired by the mythology of the 1972 novel Watership Down.

Biography 

Originally from Brighton and Hove, East Sussex, the quintet was formed with the intention of recording a trilogy of albums,  entitled The Warren of Snares, based on an interpretation of the mythology present within the 1972 novel Watership Down by Richard Adams. The trilogy is composed of the albums Owsla, Elil and Inlé, co-produced by several labels. In the novel, Efrafa is a rabbit colony ruled by a dictator, who oppresses rebels through his elite police, the Owsla. In the context of the bands concept, Owsla represents the populace around which the story revolves, the Efrafa representing humanity. In the clutches of a theocratic dictatorship, their society is on the brink of collapse. With the encroachment of the Efrafa, an invasive species, this dictatorship turns to blind faith, obedience and punishment for answers. The story records the uprising by those who defy the word of rule and religion, culminating in not only the dethronement of their leader, but a futile charge against the Efrafa.

The band presents their political and social ideology, which includes references to animal rights (they all are vegans) and deeply held atheism; they also attack humanity's destructive habits, while analysing their relationship with religion and fight against tyranny. Among their influences, the band cites Agalloch, Godspeed You! Black Emperor, His Hero Is Gone and Neurosis. The trilogy is cyclical and runs in reverse; with Owsla representing the climax and eventual rebirth of the story. This is signified by a passage of cello which bookends the trilogy - representing the eventual rise and fall of empires and our inability to learn from past mistakes.

The band's first album, Owsla, came out in 2006, alternating the D-beat of emo crust with the melancholic melody of post-rock, along with some post metal influences. The album title is a word in lapine language that in the novel corresponds to the elite warriors of the warren, who very often take advantage of their position by abusing their power over other rabbits.  In the context of the record, the Owsla is a name bestowed upon all by their despotic leader, in a cynical move to give his people a false sense of empowerment.  This record documents the final charge against the Efrafa.

The second album, Elil (in lapine language, "enemy"), released the following year, is divided into 3 songs, all of them over 20 minutes. The music moves through post rock/ post metal passages and a slower more brooding melodic crust, expressing a bleak melancholy atmosphere, progressively taking inspiration from doom metal. The concept continues with a view of the psychology of those within a society fighting religious oppression, both internal and external.

The last release, Inlé, came out in 2009. The doom metal frame that was only an influence in the previous works of the band, becomes the predominant genre, creating sonic images of emotion and desolation. The black cover and the album title, featuring Inlé, the black rabbit of death, anticipating the atmosphere of this work divided into 7 melancholic and gloomy tracks. Stylistically, the doom metal and post-rock are the main reference points and replace the speed of  D-beat hardcore with introspective melody. The story begins with this record, a society on the brink of self-destruction, a maniacal ruler wielding theocratic ideology, oppressing and abusing, offering nothing in the face of a much greater threat, the encroachment of humanity upon their land.

After releasing this album the band parted ways, as their only goal was to release this trilogy. Their discography was later published in a boxset called The Warren of Snares Trilogy. Their last concert was in Brighton, on 5 December 2009. Singer Alex CF later formed a number of concept bands, including Momentum, Light bearer, Anopheli, Archivist and Morrow.
Guitarists Steve McCusker and Neil Kingsbury went on to start Brighton-based drone rock band Blackstorm (2007-2014) with Kingsbury going on to play in Orange Goblin as an additional live guitarist in 2013 and for the 20th Anniversary shows for Desertfest in 2015 then bass and guitar for Earthtone9 in 2016 to 2022.

In addition to the trilogy they have also produced 3 EPs: a split with Down to Agony (2007), Tharn (a collaboration with Paper Aeroplane) (2008) and The Burial (2009), and a DVD with footage of their only U.S. tour, their final show at Westhill Hall in Brighton, UK on 5 December 2009, and photographs and artwork (non-audio).

Discography

Studio albums
 2006 – Owsla (Alerta Antifascista, Behind the Scenes, Deskontento Records, Fight For Your Mind, Symphony of Destruction)
 2007 – Elil (Alerta Antifascista, Behind the Scenes, Be-Part.Records, Deskontento Records, Fight For Your Mind, Halo of Flies Records,  Sound Devastation Records, Symphony of Destruction)
 2009 – Inlé (Alerta Antifascista, Behind the Scenes, Denovali Records, Halo of Flies Records, Sound Devastation Records)

Splits and EPs
 2007 – Down to Agony / Fall of Efrafa split (Alerta Antifascista, Behind the Scenes, Be-Part.Records, Contraszt! Records, Laboratorio 12, Sadness of Noise Records)
 2008 – Tharn (Sound Devastation Records, Tadpole Records)
 2009 – The Burial (Tadpole Records)

Compilations 
 2010 – The Warren of Snares

Videography
 2010 – "The Road"

Members 
Michael Douglas – bass
George Miles – drums
Neil Kingsbury – guitar
Alex CF– vocals
Steven McCusker – guitar

References

External links 
Scheda Discography

Musical groups established in 2005
Musical groups disestablished in 2009
English punk rock groups
English post-rock groups
English doom metal musical groups
British crust and d-beat groups
British post-hardcore musical groups
Post-metal musical groups
Sludge metal musical groups
Musical groups from Brighton and Hove
Denovali Records artists
Musical quintets
2005 establishments in England
2009 disestablishments in England